İzmir, the third largest city in Turkey, is home to 14 buildings taller than . Most of these buildings have been built after 2010 and are clustered near Bayraklı. The Hilton İzmir, built between 1987–91, is considered to be the first skyscraper in the city and was the third tallest building in Turkey when it opened in 1991. The Mistral Office Tower, topped out in 2016, is the tallest building in Turkey outside of Istanbul and the 5th tallest overall.

As of 2021, several more skyscrapers are either planned or under construction. Among them is the MAHALL BOMONTI IZMIR, which will become the tallest building in Izmir at 240m high with 58 floors.

Tallest Buildings

Below are the tallest buildings in Izmir, Turkey.

Buildings under construction & preparation

Proposed

References